{{DISPLAYTITLE:C13H9NO}}
The molecular formula C13H9NO (molar mass: 195.22 g/mol, exact mass: 195.0684 u) may refer to:

 Acridone
 CR gas, or dibenzoxazepine